Dudley Hollingsworth Bowen Jr. (born June 25, 1941) is a senior United States district judge of the United States District Court for the Southern District of Georgia.

Education and career

Bowen was born in Augusta, Georgia, the son of the owner of a local hardware business. He attended the Washington and Lee University in Lexington, Virginia from 1958 to 1959. He transferred to the University of Georgia and received an Artium Baccalaureus degree in 1964. He received a Bachelor of Laws from the University of Georgia School of Law in 1965. He was in private practice of law in Augusta from 1965 to 1966. He was in the United States Army as a lieutenant in the infantry from 1966 to 1968. He was in private practice of law in Augusta from 1968 to 1972. He was a Referee in Bankruptcy for the Southern District of Georgia from 1972 to 1973. He was a United States Bankruptcy Judge for the Southern District of Georgia from 1973 to 1975. He was in private practice of law in Augusta from 1975 to 1979.

Federal judicial service

Bowen was nominated by President Jimmy Carter on July 19, 1979, to the United States District Court for the Southern District of Georgia, to a new seat created by 92 stat. 1629. The nomination was criticized by the Southern Regional Council, which complained that Bowen, who had belonged to whites-only organizations and was a fundraiser for Senator Sam Nunn, had been chosen over a well-qualified black attorney; Nunn defended Bowen as qualified. He was confirmed by the United States Senate on November 26, 1979, and received his commission on November 27, 1979. He served as chief judge from 1997 to 2004. He assumed senior status on June 25, 2006.

Notable cases

Among Bowen's cases was litigation over the location of protests of the Masters Tournament, the controversial criminal trial of Charles Walker, the criminal case of spy Otto Attila Gilbert, and the criminal trial of the mayor of Augusta, who was convicted of taking kickbacks.

References

Sources
 

1941 births
Living people
People from Augusta, Georgia
Military personnel from Georgia (U.S. state)
Judges of the United States District Court for the Southern District of Georgia
United States district court judges appointed by Jimmy Carter
20th-century American judges
United States Army officers
University of Georgia alumni
University of Georgia School of Law alumni
Georgia (U.S. state) lawyers
Judges of the United States bankruptcy courts
21st-century American judges